"Nude" is a song by the English rock band Radiohead. It was released in March 2008 as the second single from their seventh studio album, In Rainbows (2007).

Radiohead first recorded "Nude" during the sessions for their third album, OK Computer (1997), but were not satisfied with the results. They performed it several times over the following decade and it became one of their best-known unreleased songs. For In Rainbows, Radiohead rearranged the song around a bassline written by Colin Greenwood.

"Nude" was promoted with a music video and a competition inviting fans to create remixes using the separated stem tracks. Boosted by sales of the stems, "Nude" reached number 21 on the UK Singles Chart and number 37 on the US Billboard Hot 100, making it Radiohead's first US top-40 hit since their debut single "Creep" (1992).

History
"Nude" had working titles including "Failure to Receive Repayment Will Put Your House at Risk", "Big Ideas" and "(Don't Get Any) Big Ideas". The final title derives from an early version of the chorus, which had the line: "What do you look like when you're nude?"

Radiohead recorded a version of "Nude" during the first sessions for their third album, OK Computer (1997), with their producer Nigel Godrich. This version, inspired by Al Green, featured a Hammond organ, a "straighter" feel and different lyrics. The band was initially pleased with the recording but, according to Godrich, "for some reason everyone went off it".

Thom Yorke first performed "Nude" in the late 1990s during a solo performance in Japan. Radiohead performed it several times over the following decade and it became one of their best-known unreleased songs. They and Godrich worked on "Nude" again during the sessions for their albums Kid A (2000) and Hail to the Thief (2003), but were not satisfied with the results. In 2004, Yorke said he had considered asking Elvis Costello and the Attractions to record it, feeling they would do a better job, but that he did not "have the guts".

During the early sessions for Radiohead's seventh album, In Rainbows (2007), Colin Greenwood wrote a new bassline for the song. According to Godrich, this "transformed it from something very straight into something that had much more of a rhythmic flow". The band also removed a chorus and wrote a new ending. They performed the new arrangement, along with other new material, on their 2006 tour before recording three takes for In Rainbows. The final take was used, with overdubs recorded in the Hospital Club in Covent Garden, London. 

Yorke said he did not enjoy singing the song when it was first written, as it was "too feminine, too high". After it was finished, he said: "Now I enjoy it exactly for that reason – because it is a bit uncomfortable, a bit out of my range, and it's really difficult to do. And it brings something out in me." Godrich said in 2008 that songs "have a window where they are really most alive – and you have to capture it", and that "Nude" had missed its window. With reinvention, Radiohead were able to "capture it again in a way that resonated for the people playing it". He said the song had not changed, only the performers.

Composition 
Pitchfork described "Nude" as a "graceful and sorrowful version" of "sneering, knees-up" songs by the Kinks or Blur, or an inverse of Radiohead's 1998 single "No Surprises". The lyrics address "suburban ennui, crushing boredom, unfulfilling go-nowhere lives". The chord progression uses a double-tonic complex, suggesting the keys of both E major and its relative minor C#.

Music video
The music video for "Nude" was directed by Adam Buxton and Garth Jennings. It premiered as part of a Radiohead webcast on December 31, 2007, one day before the retail release of In Rainbows. The video features Radiohead performing in slow motion with feathers filling the screen. Buxton and Jennings filmed the video quickly, then edited it on laptop and uploaded it to YouTube. Colin Greenwood said: "It was so cool because we didn't have to go through three weeks of video commissioning and receiving dodgy scripts set on abandoned skyscrapers in downtown LA or something. If you go in thinking 'let's try it', it's really liberating."

Release 
"Nude" was released as a single on 31 March 2008. Radiohead held a competition for fans to create remixes from the individual stem tracks of guitar, drums, bass, vocals and strings, available to purchase via iTunes. The entries were streamed on the Radiohead website. A performance of "Nude" was included on the 2008 live video In Rainbows – From the Basement. Early versions of "Nude", recorded in the OK Computer period, were included in the special edition of the 2017 OK Computer reissue OKNOTOK 1997 2017 and the 2019 compilation MiniDiscs [Hacked].

Reception 
"Nude" outperformed the previous In Rainbows single, "Jigsaw Falling into Place", reaching number 21 on the UK Singles Chart. It reached number 37 on the US Billboard Hot 100, making it Radiohead's second top-40 hit after their debut single, "Creep", reached number 34 in 1993. It was also the first Radiohead song to make the Billboard Pop 100. Sales included sales of the remix stems, boosting the single's chart performance. 

In 2020, the Guardian writer Jazz Monroe named "Nude" the seventh-greatest Radiohead song, writing: "After kicking around in Radiohead lore for more than a decade, 'Nude' ... found stunning form, first by channelling Björk – choppy coos, weeping strings – and then in a finale as bright and penetrating as dawn."

Charts

Certifications

Track listings

7"

 "Nude"
 "4 Minute Warning"

CD

 "Nude" – 4:17
 "Down Is the New Up" – 5:00
 "4 Minute Warning" – 4:05

Personnel

Radiohead
 Colin Greenwood
 Jonny Greenwood
 Ed O'Brien
 Philip Selway
 Thom Yorke

Additional musicians
 The Millennia Ensemble – strings
 Everton Nelson – leading
 Sally Herbert – conducting

Production
 Nigel Godrich – production, mixing, engineering
 Richard Woodcraft – engineering
 Hugo Nicolson – engineering
 Dan Grech-Marguerat – engineering
 Bob Ludwig – mastering

Artwork
 Stanley Donwood
 Dr Tchock

References

Radiohead songs
XL Recordings singles
2008 singles
Song recordings produced by Nigel Godrich
Songs written by Thom Yorke
Songs written by Colin Greenwood
Songs written by Jonny Greenwood
Songs written by Philip Selway
Songs written by Ed O'Brien
2007 songs